William Douglas Gilmour (born December 29, 1942 in Powell River, British Columbia) is a Canadian politician. A Registered Professional Forester, he was elected as an opposition Member of Parliament for the Comox Alberni riding in the 1993 election.  He was re-elected in the Nanaimo-Alberni constituency in the 1997 election.  In both elections he ran as a member of the Reform Party.  At the end of his second term, the Reform Party folded into the Canadian Alliance.  He did not run in the 2000 general election.

References 
 

1942 births
Canadian Alliance MPs
20th-century Canadian politicians
Living people
Members of the House of Commons of Canada from British Columbia
People from Powell River, British Columbia
Reform Party of Canada MPs